Men's lightweight coxless four competition at the 2008 Summer Olympics in Beijing was held from August 10 to 17 at the Shunyi Olympic Rowing-Canoeing Park.

This rowing event is a sweep rowing event, meaning that each rower has one oar and rows on only one side. Four rowers crew each boat, and no coxswain is used. As a lightweight rowing event, rowers were limited to a maximum body mass of 72.5 kilograms each and 70 kilograms on average.

The competition consisted of multiple rounds. Finals were held to determine the placing of each boat; these finals were given letters with those nearer to the beginning of the alphabet meaning a better ranking. Semifinals were named based on which finals they fed, with each semifinal having two possible finals.

During the first round three heats were held. The top three boats in each heat advanced to the A/B semifinals, with the rest moving to the repechage. The repechage was a single heat, with the best three of the four competing boats moving on to the A/B semifinals as well. The fourth-place finisher in the repechage was given an overall ranking of 13th overall, out of the 13 boats in the competition.

Only A/B semifinals were held. For each of the two semifinal races, the top three boats moved on to the better of the two finals (the A final), while the bottom three boats went to the lesser of the two finals (the B final).

The third and final round was the Finals. Each final determined a set of rankings. The A final determined the medals, along with the rest of the places through 6th. The B final gave rankings from 7th to 12th.

Schedule
All times are China Standard Time (UTC+8)

Results

Heats
Qualification Rules: 1-3->SA/B, 4..->R

Heat 1

Heat 2

Heat 3

Repechage
Qualification Rules: 1-3->SA/B

Semifinals A/B
Qualification Rules: 1-3->FA, 4..->FB

Semifinal A/B 1

Semifinal A/B 2

Final B

Final A

References

External links
NYT Olympic Report

Rowing at the 2008 Summer Olympics
Men's events at the 2008 Summer Olympics